Kir-Balar (also known as Kir, Kirr) is a pair of closely  related Afro-Asiatic languages spoken in Kir Bengbet and Kir Bajang’le, villages, Bauchi LGA, Bauchi State, Nigeria.

Notes 

West Chadic languages
Languages of Nigeria